is a Japanese former swimmer who competed in the 1976 Summer Olympics. At the time of the Montreal Olympics, he was studying at Waseda University. He then got a job in Dentsu. He also served as the co-executive producer of the movie Real Onigokko (2008). He is currently the Deputy Director of Public Relations Bureau at the Tokyo Organising Committee of the Olympic and Paralympic Games.

References

1957 births
Living people
Japanese male medley swimmers
Japanese male freestyle swimmers
Olympic swimmers of Japan
Swimmers at the 1976 Summer Olympics
Asian Games medalists in swimming
Asian Games gold medalists for Japan
Asian Games silver medalists for Japan
Swimmers at the 1974 Asian Games
Swimmers at the 1978 Asian Games
Medalists at the 1974 Asian Games
Medalists at the 1978 Asian Games
20th-century Japanese people